Claude Chagnon (born March 21, 1948) was a Canadian professional ice hockey centre who was selected by the Montreal Canadiens in the first round (sixth overall) of the 1964 NHL Amateur Draft. Chagnon never played a game in the NHL.

Chagnon was born in St. Pierre, Quebec, Canada.

Career statistics

See also

List of Montreal Canadiens players

References

External links
 

1948 births
Canadian ice hockey centres
Living people
Montreal Canadiens draft picks
Sportspeople from Quebec
National Hockey League first-round draft picks
Ice hockey people from Quebec